Zhe or Že (Ж ж; italics: Ж ж) is a letter of the Cyrillic script. It commonly represents the voiced retroflex sibilant . It is also often used with D (Д) to approximate the sound in English of the Latin letter J with a ДЖ combination.

History
It is not known how the character for Zhe was derived. No similar letter exists in Greek, Latin or any other alphabet of the time, though there is some graphic similarity with its Glagolitic counterpart Zhivete  which represents the same sound. However, the origin of Zhivete, like that of most Glagolitic letters, is unclear.  One possibility is that it was formed from two connecting Hebrew letters Shin , the bottom one inverted.  Zhe may also be derived from the Coptic letter  ⟨Ϫϫ⟩, supported by the phonetic value ( represents the sound /d͡ʒ/ in Coptic) and shape of the letter, which the Glagolitic counterpart Zhivete  resembles even more closely.

It may be a ligature, formed from combining two "K" letters (one backward form) sharing a common stem.

Zhe was not used in the Cyrillic numeral system.

Usage
Zhe is used in the alphabets of all Slavic languages using a Cyrillic alphabet, and of most non-Slavic languages which use a Cyrillic alphabet. The position in the alphabet and the sound represented by the letter vary from language to language.

Zhe can also be used in Leet speak or faux Cyrillic in place of the letter , or to represent the symbol of the rap duo Kris Kross (a ligature of two back-to-back letter K's).

Transliteration
Ж is most often transliterated as the digraph  for English-language readers (as in Doctor Zhivago, Доктор Живаго, or Georgy Zhukov, Георгий Жуков). The scientific transliteration convention comes from Czech spelling and is also used in the Latin alphabets of several other Slavic languages (Slovak, Sorbian, Serbo-Croatian and Slovene). Thus, Leonid Brezhnev's surname  (Леонид Брежнев) could be transliterated as "Brežnev", as it is spelled in a number of Slavic languages.

Related letters and other similar characters
Ӂ ӂ : Cyrillic letter Zhe with breve
Ź ź : Latin letter Z with acute
Ž ž : Latin letter Z with caron
Ż ż : Latin letter Z with dot above
J j : Latin letter J - the same sound in Romanian, Turkish, Azerbaijani, French, and Portuguese
Ʒ ʒ : Latin letter Ezh

Computing codes

External links